General elections were held in Anguilla on 29 June 2020. Due to the COVID-19 pandemic, an Order in Council was made to allow the elections to be postponed until 11 September at the latest. However it was not invoked.

Electoral system
The 13-member House of Assembly consists of seven members elected in single-member constituencies by first-past-the-post voting, four at-large members elected from the entire island by plurality at-large voting and two ex officio members. Voters may vote up to four candidates in the at-large seats, which replaced two appointees. Voters must be at least 18 years old, whilst candidates must be at least 21.

Endorsements 
For Dee-Ann Kentish-Rogers (Anguilla Progressive Movement candidate in Valley South):
Celine Willers, Miss Universe Germany 2018
Caitlin Tyson, Miss Universe Cayman Islands 2018
Aniska Tonge, Miss Universe US Virgin Islands 2018
Anna Burdzy, Miss Universe Great Britain 2017
Selma Kamanya, Miss Universe Zambia 2018 
Aldy Bernard, Miss Universe Dominican Republic 2018
For Haydn Hughes (Anguilla Progressive Movement candidate in Road South):
Charlamagne tha God, American radio and TV personality

Campaign 
The ruling Anguilla United Front (which won six of the seven elected seats in 2015) nominated a full slate of eleven candidates in November 2019. The opposition Anguilla Progressive Movement also nominated eleven candidates in December 2019.

Results

By constituency

References

Anguilla
2020 in Anguilla
Elections in Anguilla
2020 elections in British Overseas Territories